The Name of the Rose is a historical drama television miniseries created and directed by Giacomo Battiato for RAI. It is based on the 1980 international bestseller novel of the same name by Umberto Eco. The series stars John Turturro as William of Baskerville and Rupert Everett as Bernard Gui. It was co-produced by Italian production companies 11 Marzo Film and Palomar, and distributed internationally by the Tele München Group.

The Name of the Rose premiered on 4 March 2019 on Rai 1, which commissioned the series in November 2017.

Plot 
Piedmontese Alps, Northern Italy, end of November 1327. Pope John XXII and the Emperor Louis the Bavarian are at war: the separation between religion and politics is at stake. The Franciscan friar William of Baskerville, followed by the young novice Adso of Melk, reaches an isolated Benedictine abbey to participate in a dispute over the evangelical counsel of poverty between representatives of the Franciscan Order and the Avignon papacy. Upon arrival in the abbey the two are involved in a chain of mysterious deaths.

Cast

Starring
 John Turturro as William of Baskerville, Franciscan friar, inspired from William of Ockam.
 Rupert Everett as Bernard Gui, Dominican inquisitor.
 Peter Davison narrates the events of the series from the point of view of an old Adso.
 Fabrizio Bentivoglio as Remigio of Varagine, ex-Dulcinian cellarer.
 Greta Scarano as Margherita / Anna, Dolcino's partner / Margherita's and Dolcino's secret daughter.
 Kiara McKormick portrays Anna as a child.
 Richard Sammel as Malachi of Hildesheim, librarian of the abbey.
 Roberto Herlitzka as Alinardo of Grottaferrata, the oldest monk.
  as Nicolas of Morimondo, monk and master glassmaker.
  as Berengar of Arundel, assistant librarian of the abbey.
 Antonia Fotaras as the Occitan Girl, Adso's lover.
 Guglielmo Favilla as Venanzio of Salvemec, monk in the Scriptorium.
 Piotr Adamczyk as Severinus of Saint Emmeram, monk and herbalist.
 Tchéky Karyo as Pope John XXII.
 Benjamin Stender as Benno of Uppsala, young scandinavian monk and new assistant librarian.
 Claudio Bigagli as Jerome of Kaffa, Franciscan friar and bishop of the imperial delegation.
 Corrado Invernizzi as Michael of Cesena, Franciscan theologian and leader of the imperial delegation.
 Max Malatesta as Aymaro of Alessandria, amanuensis monk.
 Alessio Boni as Dolcino of Novara, founder and leader of the Dulcinians.
 Sebastian Koch as the Baron of Neuenberg, emperor's general and Adso's father.
 James Cosmo as Jorge of Burgos, old blind monk and former librarian.
 Michael Emerson as the Abbone of Fossanova, abbot of the monastery.

Also starring
 Rinat Khismatouline as Cardinal Bertrand du Pouget, papal legate and leader of the papal delegation.
  as Bianca.
 David Brandon as Hugh of Newcastle, Franciscan theologian and scholastic philosopher, disciple of Duns Scotus.

Supporting
  as Adelmo of Otranto, young illuminator monk in the scriptorium.
 Alfredo Pea as Pacifico of Tivoli.
 Derek Boschi as Guillam de Masan.
 Federigo Ceci as Eudes, Bishop of Carpentras.
 Diego Delpiano as Martino.
 Gianluigi Fogacci as Roberto, count of Florence.
 Nicholas Turturro as Pedro López de Luna, Aragonese politician and Archbishop of Zaragoza.

Episodes

Production 
Filming began in 2018. The miniseries was shot in Italy and in particular in Abruzzo: at the gorges of Fara San Martino, in Roccamorice, at the hermitage of Santo Spirito a Majella and at the castle of Roccascalegna. Other panoramas were shot in Perugia and Bevagna, while churches and cloisters were reconstructed in the Cinecittà studios in Rome. Other scenes were shot in the Vulci archaeological natural park in the territory of Montalto di Castro and in the Tusculum Archaeological Cultural Park.

The original dialogues in Occitan language have been translated and supervised in collaboration with the University of Salerno.

Distribution
In Italy, the miniseries made its world premiere on 4 March 2019 on Rai 1. It premiered on 5 March 2019 on OCS in France, on 23 May 2019 on Sundance TV in the United States, on 24 May 2019 on Sky Deutschland in Germany, on 3 October 2019 on SBS in Australia, on 11 October 2019 on BBC Two in the United Kingdom, and on 3 July 2022 on KBS 1TV in South Korea.

References

External links
 

2019 Italian television series debuts
2019 Italian television series endings
2010s Italian television miniseries
Historical television series
The Name of the Rose
RAI original programming